Kudla Cafe is a 2016 Indian Tulu language film directed by Surya Menon. The star cast of the film includes Jyothish Shetty, Naveen D Padil, Raghu Pandeshwar, Aahana Kumra, Shaine Shetty, Santhosh Shetty, Sudhir Raaj Urva, Ashok Shetty, Kishore Kottari, Bantwal Jayaramachaar, Thimmappa Kulal, Bhavani Shankar, Shashiraaj Kavoor, Manoj Puttur, Shruthi Shetty, Anusha Kotian, Sanam Amin, Karthik Kotian, Suraj Sanil and Naveen Shetty Mijar in lead roles. The film has been produced by Ranjan Shetty and Surya Menon under the banner of Yodha Motion Pictures. Kudla Cafe was premiered at the 8th Bengaluru International Film Festival on 2 February 2016. The film was released in Mangaluru on 12 February 2016.

Cast 
 Jyothish Shetty
 Naveen D. Padil
 Raghu Pandeshwar
 Aahana Kumra
 Shine S. Shetty
 Santosh Shetty
 Sudhir Raj Urwa

References